Eransus is a locality located in the municipality of Valle de Egüés, in Navarre province, Spain. As of 2020, it has a population of 14.

Geography 
Eransus is located 15km east of Pamplona.

References

Populated places in Navarre